Manuel Montejo Bofill (October 16, 1935 – January 19, 2000) was a Cuban professional baseball player and  right-handed relief pitcher who appeared in 12 games in Major League Baseball (MLB) for the Detroit Tigers in .

Montejo's professional career lasted for all or parts of eight seasons between 1957 and 1966. His MLB trial during the latter months of the 1961 campaign saw him allow 13 hits and six bases on balls in 16 innings pitched, without earning a decision or a save. He gave up seven earned runs to compile an ERA of 3.86. 

He died in Havana at age 64 in 2000, though news of his death did not reach researchers until 2014.

External links
Baseball-Reference.com page

1935 births
2000 deaths
Albuquerque Dukes players
Denver Bears players
Detroit Tigers players
Havana Sugar Kings players
Major League Baseball players from Cuba
Cuban expatriate baseball players in the United States
Major League Baseball pitchers
Oklahoma City 89ers players
Pericos de Puebla players
Plataneros de Tabasco players
People from Caibarién
Salisbury Astros players
San Antonio Missions players
Victoria Rosebuds players
Cuban expatriate baseball players in Mexico
Cuban expatriate baseball players in Nicaragua